Crack the whip (also known as Pop the Whip or Snap the Whip) is a simple outdoor children's game that involves physical coordination and is usually played in small groups, either on grass or ice, usually grass. One player, chosen as the "head" of the whip, runs (or skates) around in random directions, with subsequent players holding on to the hand of the previous player. The entire "tail" of the whip moves in those directions but with much more force toward the end of the tail. The longer the tail, the more the forces act on the last player and the tighter they have to hold on. As the game progresses and more players fall off, some of those who were previously located near the end of the tail and have fallen off can "move up" and be in a more secure position by grabbing onto the tail as it is moving, provided they can get back on before others do. There is no objective to this game other than enjoying the experience.

The game is also illustrated in Winslow Homer's 1872 painting Snap the Whip.

References

Children's games
Whip arts